The Episcopal Church in Minnesota, formerly known as the Episcopal Diocese of Minnesota, is a diocese of the Episcopal Church in the United States of America which has jurisdiction over all of Minnesota, except Clay County, which is in the Episcopal Diocese of North Dakota. It is in Province VI and its offices are in Minneapolis. It has two cathedrals: the Cathedral of Our Merciful Saviour in Faribault and St. Mark's Episcopal Cathedral in Minneapolis. As of December 2013, there were 20,964 members. It has 110 faith communities (this includes 105 churches and the organizations Episcopal Homes of Minnesota, the Episcopal House of Prayer, The Sheltering Arms Foundation, Breck School, and Shattuck-St. Mary’s School). It is affiliated with the Minnesota Council of Churches, The Joint Religious Legislative Coalition, and The Resource Center for Churches. Henry Benjamin Whipple was the first bishop of the Episcopal Church in Minnesota. Craig Loya is the current bishop. The Diocese of Duluth was established as a Missionary Diocese from the Diocese of Minnesota in 1895 and was merged back into the Diocese of Minnesota on May 24, 1944.

Bishops of Minnesota

 Henry Benjamin Whipple 1859 - 1901 * Mahlon Norris Gilbert, coadjutor 1886-1900
 Samuel Cook Edsall 1901 - 1917
 Frank Arthur McElwain 1917 - 1943
 Stephen Edwards Keeler 1943 - 1956
 Hamilton Hyde Kellogg  1956 - 1971
 Philip Frederick McNairy 1971 - 1978
 Robert Marshall Anderson 1978 - 1993
 James Louis Jelinek 1993 - 2010
 Brian Norman Prior 2010 - 2020
 Craig Loya June 6, 2020 -

Records

Records of the Episcopal Church in Minnesota are available at the Minnesota Historical Society. They cover the period from the arrival of the first Episcopal missionaries into the area in the 1820s through the bishopric of Robert M. Anderson, which ended in 1993. They document the organization, administration, and history of the diocese and its parishes and missions through the records of the diocesan offices and parishes and the papers of numerous diocesan officials and leaders, including George Clinton Tanner, Stephen E. Keeler, Frederick F. Kramer, Hamilton Hyde Kellogg, Philip F. McNairy, and Robert M. Anderson.

References

External links
The Episcopal Church in Minnesota
Journal of the Annual Convention, Diocese of Minnesota

 
Minnesota
Religious organizations established in 1859
Anglican dioceses established in the 19th century
1859 establishments in Minnesota
Province 6 of the Episcopal Church (United States)